Parliamentary elections were held in Syria on 25 and 26 May 1973. The result was a victory for the Arab Socialist Ba'ath Party, which won 122 of the 186 seats. They were also the first elections in which the Syrian-led Ba'ath Party ran for seats in parliament, the original Arab Socialist Ba'ath Party had been dissolved in 1966.

Results

References

Syria
1973 in Syria
Parliamentary elections in Syria
Election and referendum articles with incomplete results